Nancy Jean Turner  (born 1947) is a notable North American ethnobiologist, originally qualified in botany, who has done extensive research work with the indigenous peoples of British Columbia, the results of which she has documented in a number of books and numerous articles.

Life
Turner was born in Berkeley in California in 1947 but moved to British Columbia when she was five. She obtained her doctorate in Ethnobotany after studying the Bella Coola, Haida and Lillooet indigenous groups of the Pacific North-West. She works by interviewing the groups' elder members to identify their names for plants and their uses. Comparison and scientific analysis of this data has enabled her to draw conclusions. Turner's research identified not only the role that plants have had in these group's culture but also the effects that indigenous people have had historically on the landscape of Canada.

Order of British Columbia
The Government of British Columbia admitted Nancy Turner to the Order of British Columbia in 1999 and describe her, her work, and her contributions as follows:

Nancy J. Turner ... is an internationally-distinguished scholar and scientist who has devoted her life to documenting the endangered knowledge of First Nations. As a pioneer in ethnobiology, her more than 25 years of research have focused on the diverse interactions of First Peoples in British Columbia with the ecosystems they depended on and the critical role of plant resources for foods, medicines and materials. Her research will be seen as a most valuable compendium of aboriginal culture and plant lore in British Columbia.

Bibliography

Books written
 
 
 
 
 
 Turner, Nancy J. (2014). Ancestral Pathways, Ancestral Knowledge: Ethnobotany and Ecological Knowledge of Indigenous Peoples of Northwestern North America. 2 vols. Kingston and Montreal: McGill-Queen's University Press. .

Books edited
 Deur, Douglas & Turner, Nancy J. (eds.) (2005) Keeping It Living, Traditions of Plant Use and Cultivation on the Northwest Coast of North America. Vancouver: UBC Press and Seattle: University of Washington Press.
 Turner, Nancy J., Marianne B. Ignace and Sandra L. Peacock, editors. (2016) Secwepemc people and plants : research papers in Shuswap ethnobotany. Tacoma, WA : Society of Ethnobiology, 2016. .

Articles online
 
 .

Distinctions
 R.E. Schultes Award (1997)
 Order of British Columbia (1999)
 Fellow of the Royal Society of Canada (1999)
  Canadian Botanical Association’s Lawson Medal (2002)
 Killam Research Fellowship (2007)
 William L. Brown Award for Excellence in Genetic Resource Conservation (2008)
 Order of Canada (2009)

External links
 Society of Ethnobiology
 University of Victoria staff page
  
 
 Dr Nancy Turner, wa-ter.ca
 Nancy Turner, Uvic.ca

References

Ethnobiologists
Ethnobotanists
Canadian women botanists
Canadian women biologists
1947 births
Living people
University of British Columbia Faculty of Science alumni
University of Victoria alumni
Academic staff of the University of Victoria
Members of the Order of Canada
Members of the Order of British Columbia
Fellows of the Royal Society of Canada
Linguists of Salishan languages
20th-century Canadian biologists
20th-century Canadian women scientists
21st-century Canadian biologists
21st-century Canadian women scientists
20th-century Canadian botanists
21st-century Canadian botanists